The Cougar is a weekly newspaper run entirely by students at the University of Houston.

In publication since April 6, 1928, The Cougar was originally named The Cougar but was renamed The Daily Cougar and again renamed The Cougar in the fall of 2014 when the print edition turned weekly. The Cougar operates as a student-managed, school-funded forum for the university community.

The Cougar publishes on Wednesday during the school year, but stories area added daily to its website presence.

History

The newspaper was founded in 1928 by University of Houston students as The Cougar.  By the 1950s, circulation had increased to 6,800.   In 1965, the paper began a press run of four days a week with a release schedule of Tuesday through Friday.  On March 27, 1978, the newspaper added Mondays to its release schedule, and was renamed to The Daily Cougar.

As of 2003, The Cougar was Houston's second largest English-language daily newspaper, with a circulation of nearly 12,000 and a readership approaching 40,000.

Awards
2016:
Associated Collegiate Press Newspaper Pacemaker Award Winner 
2016:
Houston Press Club 2016 Lone Star Awards - Best Student Newspaper winner
2004:
Columbia Scholastic Press Association Gold Circle Award - certificate of merit, Single Page Color Photo Layout 
Columbia Scholastic Press Association Gold Circle Award - certificate of merit, Tabloid Feature Page Design for Newspapers 
Columbia Scholastic Press Association Gold Circle Award - first place, General Feature in Newspapers 

2002:
2001:
Columbia Scholastic Press Association Gold Circle Award - first place, Newspaper Tabloid Overall Design 

1999:

Associated Collegiate Press Newspaper of the Year - third place 
1996:
Columbia Scholastic Press Association - Gold medalist, spring 1996 
Columbia Scholastic Press Association - Gold medalist, fall 1995 
1994:
Columbia Scholastic Press Association - medalist, fall 1994 
Columbia Scholastic Press Association - medalist, spring 1994 
1993:
Society of Professional Journalists Region 8 Mark of Excellence Awards, first place, Feature Writing 
Society of Professional Journalists Region 8 Mark of Excellence Awards, third place, In-Depth Reporting

1992:
Columbia Scholastic Press Association - first place, fall 1992 
Columbia Scholastic Press Association medalist, spring 1992 
Columbia Scholastic Press Association Gold Circle Award - first place, Page One Design 
Columbia Scholastic Press Association Gold Circle Award - second place, Editorial Writing 

1991:
Associated Collegiate Press - first class honor rating, 1991-1992

Notable alumni
Dan Cook
Saul Friedman
Jack Valenti
Welcome W. Wilson, Sr.
Donald Barthelme
Adrees Latif - 2008 Pulitzer Prize

References

External links

The Daily Cougar
University of Houston

University of Houston
Student newspapers published in Texas
Publications established in 1927
Newspapers published in Houston
Weekly newspapers published in Texas